Metathesis  may refer to:

Changes of vocal properties 
 Metathesis (linguistics), alteration of the order of phonemes within a word
 Quantitative metathesis,  exchange of long and short roles, without changing order of vowel sounds

Chemical change in which a pair of molecules exchange electronic patterns of bonding 
 Salt metathesis reaction, exchange of bonds between two reacting chemical species
Olefin metathesis, redistribution of olefinic (alkene) chemical bonds
Alkane metathesis,  redistribution of alkane chemical bonds
Alkyne metathesis,  redistribution of alkyne chemical bonds